Marty Jemison (born May 18, 1965 in Salt Lake City) is a former American cyclist. Since retiring from Professional Cycling, Marty has been leading tours for his own company Jemison Cycling Tours
An extended list of results can be found here His most successful day in the Tour de France was when he earned a top 5 placing during stage 13 of the 1998 Tour. He got into  successful breakaway that stayed away all day and finished nearly three minutes ahead of the Peloton.

Career
Professional from 1994 to 2000, he was most known for being the US National Road Race Champion in 1999. 

When he was a member of the U.S. Postal Service Pro Cycling Team, he participated in two Tours de France and was a teammate of Lance Armstrong. Marty started his Professional career with the Dutch-based WordPerfect team in 1994.

He was selected by U.S. National Team at the UCI World Road Race Championships in 1994 and 1997.

Major results

1993
United States National Road Race Championships amateurs
Tour de Beauce

1996
Cascade Cycling Classic
2nd of Course de la Solidarité Olympique
3rd of the Rutas de América
3rd of the Lancaster Classic

1997
Atlanta GP
First Union Grand Prix

1998
3rd of Atlanta GP

1999
United States National Road Race Championships

2000
3rd of the Wilmington Cycling Classic

Results on the Tour de France
1997: 96th
1998: 48th

References

1965 births
Living people
American male cyclists
Sportspeople from Salt Lake City
Cyclists from Utah